The 1812 United States presidential election in Ohio took place as part of the 1812 United States presidential election. Voters chose 8 representatives, or electors to the Electoral College, who voted for President and Vice President.

Ohio re-elected incumbent Democratic-Republican President James Madison over Federalist candidate DeWitt Clinton. Madison won Ohio by a margin of 38.42%.

Results

See also
 United States presidential elections in Ohio

Notes

References

Ohio
1812
1812 Ohio elections